Shopping (逛街 Guang jie) is Fann Wong (Chinese: 范文芳)'s second album release in Taiwan. It was an immensely popular pop album with over half a million sold.

The Shopping video led Hong Kong director Derek Yee to cast Fann in his Hong Kong art film, The Truth About Jane and Sam.

Track listing
Summer Rain
逛街
趁一切還來得及
不怕
孤單
下午茶
星期六
跟随
搬家
預言（文芳／張宇合唱）
示情

Fann Wong albums
1998 albums